Maynard I. Wishner (1923-2011) was a Jewish community leader, financier, and former actor in the Yiddish theater from Chicago. He graduated from the University of Chicago in 1945, and obtained a J.D. from the same institution in 1947.

He served as the National President of the American Jewish Committee in 1980–1983, President of the Council of Jewish Federations, and Chairman of the Jewish United Fund.

In 2006, he was named winner of the American Jewish Committee Mensch Award.
He was a president of what is now the Jewish Federations of North America and chaired what is now the Jewish Council for Public Affairs. He also held prominent positions in the Chicago Jewish United Fund/Jewish Federation, the Jewish Community Relations Council, and Jewish Family and Community Service.

"He was an absolutely remarkable man, very smart, very thoughtful, with a penetrating intelligence. He was open-minded, very engaged in the community," said David Harris, AJC executive director. "All of his traits were on display as a leader of AJC: the affable, personable side; the humorous side; the very serious, determined, engaged side."

Wishner received numerous awards, including the Julius Rosenwald Memorial Award, which is the Chicago Jewish Federation's highest award, and the AJC's Mensch Award.

Wishner's work to improve Greek-Jewish relations led him to receive the Frizis Award from the Hellenic American Leadership Conference.

"He devoted his time to creating understanding between ethnic, racial and religious groups," said Jonathan Levine, the former assistant national director for AJC. "There was a decency about him that was and is rare... There was no finer diplomat, professional or volunteer than Maynard Wishner".

Through his various leadership roles, Wishner met the presidents of the U.S. and several other countries, as well as Nelson Mandela after the South African leader was released from prison. The meeting "was one point in his life where he truly felt he was representing the Jewish people," said daughter Mimi Wishner Segel. "His leadership skills were respected across the board, beyond the Jewish community."

Wishner was born and grew up in Chicago. He earned undergraduate and law degrees from the University of Chicago.

From 1947 to 1952, Wishner worked for the Chicago Mayor's Commission on Human Relations, as head of the commission's department of law and order and then as acting director. He was then appointed chief city prosecutor for the city's Law Department.

He was an attorney with the firm of Cole, Wishner, Epstein & Manilow before joining Walter E. Heller & Co., a finance company, where he eventually served as president and chief operating officer. He retired in 1985.

Wishner also acted in Yiddish theater.

"His theatrical skills made him an incredible storyteller and speech giver. He could engage people, make them laugh," Segel said. "He knew how to turn a phrase."

References

1923 births
2011 deaths
University of Chicago alumni
20th-century American Jews
21st-century American Jews
American Jewish Committee